Laura Greenhalgh (born 2 September 1985, in Oxford) is a British rower.

References 
 

1985 births
Living people
English female rowers
Sportspeople from Oxford

World Rowing Championships medalists for Great Britain